Jonathan Cochet (born 4 January 1977 in Alençon, France) is a French racing driver. He won the Championnat de France Formule Renault in 1997. He was a test driver for Prost Grand Prix in 2001, and he was also a test driver with the Renault Formula One team in 2006.

Career results

24 Hours of Le Mans results

Complete International Formula 3000 results
(key) (Races in bold indicate pole position) (Races in italics indicate fastest lap)

Complete Formula Nippon results
(key) (Races in bold indicate pole position) (Races in italics indicate fastest lap)

External links
 
 

1977 births
Living people
Sportspeople from Alençon
French racing drivers
French Formula Renault 2.0 drivers
French Formula Three Championship drivers
A1 Team France drivers
International Formula 3000 drivers
24 Hours of Le Mans drivers
European Le Mans Series drivers

A1 Grand Prix drivers
KTR drivers
Dandelion Racing drivers
Signature Team drivers
OAK Racing drivers
DAMS drivers
Nürburgring 24 Hours drivers